Ricochet Lost Worlds: Recharged is the third game in the Ricochet video game series by Reflexive Entertainment. The difference between the earlier Ricochet Lost Worlds and Ricochet Lost Worlds: Recharged is the idea of user-made levels that are downloadable online. Many Reflexive Entertainment Games have since had the option to download more user-made levels after the regular levels are beaten.

Around 7 December 2017, the official website that hosted all user-made levels and the forums for both the Ricochet and the Big Kahuna series were permanently shut down because they were no longer sustainable to run.

Ships 
There are five (5) designs of ships a player can choose if he or she will sign as a new player. Here are the ships:

References

External links
 Reflexive Entertainment's Official Website
 Reflexive Arcade
 The Ricochet Series Website

2004 video games
Breakout clones
Reflexive Entertainment games
Video game sequels
Video games developed in the United States
Windows games
Windows-only games